Arriva Derby is a bus operator in Derby. It is a subsidiary of Arriva Midlands.

History

In March 1880 the Derby Tramways Company commenced operating horse-drawn trams between Market Place and Derby railway station. The Derby Corporation Act of 1899 saw the Derby Corporation take over the tram lines in November 1899. Between 1903 and 1907 the network was extended and electrified.

In May 1917 a battery-powered bus entered service. A second entered service in 1920, but both were replaced with motor buses in 1924. Between January 1932 and July 1934 Derby's trams were replaced by trolleybuses. Motor buses continued to operate alongside the trolleybuses until the network began to be closed in the 1960s with the last running in September 1967.

In December 1973 Derby Corporation purchased Blue Bus Services of Willington. In 1974 Derby Corporation was renamed Derby Borough Transport and in 1977 Derby City Transport when Derby was granted city status. To comply with the Transport Act 1985, in October 1986 the assets of Derby City Transport were transferred to a new legal entity.

Following deregulation, Derby City Transport faced competition from Camms of Nottingham and Midland Red. The Blue Bus Services name and livery was applied to the whole fleet.

In July 1994 Derby City Transport was sold to British Bus and rebranded as City Rider with a yellow, red and blue livery adopted. In August 1996 British Bus was purchased by the Cowie Group and again rebranded as Arriva Derby with the corporate aquamarine and cream livery adopted.

Services

Most services depart from Derby Bus Station although some use on street stops around the City Centre 
Service X38 is jointly operated with TrentBarton
Arriva have operate University of Nottingham HopperBuses around Nottingham since September 2018.

Fleet
As of January 2020 the fleet consisted of 150 buses.

Arriva announced in early 2008 that an order for 59 new buses to update had been placed. Optare Solos, Scania OmniLinks, Scania OmniCitys and Wright Eclipse Gemini bodied Volvo B9TLs were purchased.

During 2014 seven Enviro 400's were ordered in Sapphire specification for service 38 to Sinfin.

During 2019 nineteen Wright Streetlites joined the fleet to help meet clean air targets for buses in the City Centre.

See also
List of bus operators of the United Kingdom

References

External links
Company website

Derby
Bus operators in Derbyshire
Companies based in Derby
Transport in Derby